Pete Kelly's Blues is a television series starring William Reynolds  which aired in 1959. It was created by Jack Webb, based on his 1951 radio series of the same name and the subsequent film version, Pete Kelly's Blues, from 1955.

Synopsis
Set in Kansas City during the 1920s, the series centered on Pete Kelly, a trumpet player and the leader of Pete Kelly's Original Big Seven Big. Dixieland trumpet player,  Dick Cathcart, who's best known as a member of The Lawrence Welk Show, was  dubbed in for the actual playing of Kelly's trumpet.

Cast
William Reynolds as Pete Kelly
Connee Boswell as Savannah Brown
Than Wyenn as George Lupo (Lupo was frequently mention in the radio series, but never actually appeared; Wyenn did play a different character in the movie version.)
Phil Gordon as Fred
Fred Eisley as Johnny Cassiano

Episodes

See also
Pete Kelly's Blues (film)
Pete Kelly's Blues (radio series)
Pete Kelly's Blues (song)
Songs from Pete Kelly's Blues

References

External links

1959 American television series debuts
1959 American television series endings
1950s American drama television series
Black-and-white American television shows
NBC original programming
Television series based on radio series
Television series by Mark VII Limited
Television series by Universal Television
Television series set in the 1920s
Television shows set in Kansas City, Missouri